Cranston School District is a school district located in Cranston, Rhode Island, USA, which services an approximate student population of 11,155 in pre-kindergarten through twelfth grade. With 790 full-time classroom teachers, the district's overall student/teacher ratio is 14.1:1. There are 24 schools associated with the agency, which is classified as being in or near a mid-sized city (Cranston, RI). Cranston School District allocates approximately $5,572 per pupil for instructional expenses.

Educational facilities that are a part of this agency (district). There are 23 schools listed below. Click on a school's name to find information about that school.

Elementary schools
Arlington School 
Chester W. Barrows School 
Daniel D. Waterman School 
Eden Park School 
Edgewood Highland 
Edward S. Rhodes School 
George J. Peters School 
Gladstone Street School 
Glen Hills School 
Stadium School 
Stone Hill School 
W. R. Dutemple School 
Garden City School 
Oak Lawn School 
Woodridge School
Orchard Farms School

Middle schools
Hugh B. Bain Middle School (Named a High Performing School in 2007)
Park View Middle School 
Western Hills Middle School
Hope Highlands Middle School (as of 2016)

High schools
Cranston High School East 
Cranston High School West 
Cranston Area Career & Technical Center

References

External links

 

School districts in Rhode Island
Education in Providence County, Rhode Island